Middle of the Night Show is an American late-night television series hosted by Brian Murphy. The series premiered on MTV on October 8, 2015.

Episodes

References

External links
 

2010s American late-night television series
2015 American television series debuts
2015 American television series endings
English-language television shows
MTV original programming